Charles W. Bartlett
 Marguerite Louis Blasingame
 Amelia R. Coats
 Isami Doi
 Robert Lee Eskridge
 Cornelia MacIntyre Foley
 Juliette May Fraser
 John Melville Kelly
 Kate Kelly
 Paul Landacre
 Huc-Mazelet Luquiens
 Alexander Samuel MacLeod
 Ambrose Patterson
 Louis Pohl
 Robert Riggs
 Shirley Ximena Hopper Russell

See also
 :Category:Printmakers from Hawaii
 List of artists who painted Hawaii and its people
 List of artists who sculpted Hawaii and its people

Footnotes

 Printmakers
 Printmakers
Hawaii
artists who made prints of Hawaii and its people